Zeyrek can refer to:

 Zeyrek
 Zeyrek, İspir
 Zeyrek, Kulp
 Zeyrek Mosque